COMMAND.COM is the default command-line interpreter for MS-DOS, Windows 95, Windows 98 and Windows Me. In the case of DOS, it is the default user interface as well. It has an additional role as the usual first program run after boot (init process), hence being responsible for setting up the system by running the AUTOEXEC.BAT configuration file, and being the ancestor of all processes.

COMMAND.COM's successor on OS/2 and Windows NT systems is cmd.exe, although COMMAND.COM is available in virtual DOS machines on IA-32 versions of those operating systems as well.

The compatible command processor under FreeDOS is sometimes also named FreeCom.

COMMAND.COM is a DOS program. Programs launched from COMMAND.COM are DOS programs that use the DOS API to communicate with the disk operating system.

Operating modes
As a shell, COMMAND.COM has two distinct modes of operation. The first is interactive mode, in which the user types commands which are then executed immediately. The second is batch mode, which executes a predefined sequence of commands stored as a text file with the .BAT extension.

Internal commands
Internal commands are commands stored directly inside the COMMAND.COM binary. Thus, they are always available but can only be executed directly from the command interpreter.

All commands are executed after the  key is pressed at the end of the line. COMMAND.COM is not case-sensitive, meaning commands can be typed in any mixture of upper and lower case.

 CHCP Displays or changes the current system code page.
 CHDIR, CD Changes the current working directory or displays the current directory.
 CLS Clears the screen.
 COPY Copies one file to another (if the destination file already exists, MS-DOS asks whether to replace it). (See also XCOPY, an external command that could also copy directory trees).
 CTTY Defines the device to use for input and output.
 DATE Display and set the date of the system.
 DEL, ERASE Deletes a file. When used on a directory, deletes all files inside the directory only. In comparison, the external command DELTREE deletes all subdirectories and files inside a directory as well as the directory itself.
 DIR Lists the files in the specified directory.
 ECHO Toggles whether text is displayed or not. Also displays text on the screen.
 EXIT Exits from COMMAND.COM and returns to the program which launched it.
 LFNFOR Enables or disables the return of long filenames by the FOR command. (Windows 9x).
 LOADHIGH, LH Loads a program into upper memory ( in DR DOS).
 LOCK Enables external programs to perform low-level disk access to a volume. (MS-DOS 7.1 and Windows 9x only)
 MKDIR, MD Creates a new directory.
 PATH Displays or changes the value of the PATH environment variable which controls the places where COMMAND.COM will search for executable files.
 PROMPT Displays or change the value of the PROMPT environment variable which controls the appearance of the prompt.
 RENAME, REN Renames a file or directory.
 RMDIR, RD Removes an empty directory.
 SET Sets the value of an environment variable; without arguments, shows all defined environment variables.
 TIME Display and set the time of the system.
 TRUENAME Display the fully expanded physical name of a file, resolving ASSIGN, JOIN and SUBST logical filesystem mappings.
 TYPE Display the content of a file on the console.
 UNLOCK Disables low-level disk access. (MS-DOS 7.1 and Windows 9x only)
 VER Displays the version of the operating system.
 VERIFY Enable or disable verification of writing for files.
 VOLShows information about a volume.

Batch file commands
Control structures are mostly used inside batch files, although they can also be used interactively.

 :label Defines a target for GOTO.
 CALL Executes another batch file and returns to the old one and continues.
 FOR Iteration: repeats a command for each out of a specified set of files.
 GOTO Moves execution to a specified label. Labels are specified at the beginning of a line, with a colon.
 IF Conditional statement, allows branching of the program execution.
 PAUSE Halts execution of the program and displays a message asking the user to press any key to continue.
 REM comment: any text following this command is ignored.

IF command
On exit, all external commands submit a return code (a value between 0 and 255) to the calling program. Most programs have a certain convention for their return codes (for instance, 0 for a successful execution).

If a program was invoked by COMMAND.COM, the internal IF command with its ERRORLEVEL conditional can be used to test on error conditions of the last invoked external program.

Under COMMAND.COM, internal commands do not establish a new value.

Variables
Batch files for COMMAND.COM can have four kinds of variables:
 Environment variables: These have the  form and are associated with values with the SET statement. Before DOS 3 COMMAND.COM will only expand environment variables in batch mode; that is, not interactively at the command prompt.
The parameters to the right of the ninth can be mapped into range by using the SHIFT statement.
 Loop variables: Used in loops, they have the  format when run in batch files. These variables are defined solely within a specific FOR statement, and iterate over a certain set of values defined in that FOR statement.
 Under Novell DOS 7, OpenDOS 7.01, DR-DOS 7.02 and higher, COMMAND.COM also supports a number of system information variables, a feature earlier found in 4DOS 3.00 and higher as well as in Multiuser DOS, although most of the supported variable names differ.

Redirection, piping, and chaining
Because DOS is a single-tasking operating system, piping is achieved by running commands sequentially, redirecting to and from a temporary file. COMMAND.COM makes no provision for redirecting the standard error channel.

 command < filename  Redirect standard input from a file or device
 command > filename  Redirect standard output, overwriting target file if it exists.
 command >> filename  Redirect standard output, appending to target file if it exists.
 command1 | command2  Pipe standard output from command1 to standard input of command2
 command1 ¶ command2  
 Commands separated by ASCII-20 (¶, invoked by ) are executed in sequence (chaining of commands). In other words, first command1 is executed until termination, then command2. This is an undocumented feature in COMMAND.COM of MS-DOS/PC DOS 5.0 and higher. It is also supported by COMMAND.COM of the Windows NT family as well as by DR-DOS 7.07. All versions of DR-DOS COMMAND.COM already supported a similar internal function utilizing an exclamation mark (!) instead (a feature originally derived from Concurrent DOS and Multiuser DOS) - however, in the single-user line this feature was only available internally (in built-in startup scripts like "!DATE!TIME") and indirectly through DOSKEY's $T parameter to avoid problems with ! as a valid filename character. 4DOS supports a configurable command line separator (4DOS.INI CommandSep= or SETDOS /C), which defaults to ^. COMMAND.COM in newer versions of Windows NT also supports an  separator for compatibility with the cmd syntax in OS/2 and the Windows NT family. (cmd, however, does not support the ¶ separator.)

Limitations
Generally, the command line length in interactive mode is limited to 126 characters. In MS-DOS 6.22, the command line length in interactive mode is limited to 127 characters.

In popular culture
The message "Loading COMMAND.COM" can be seen on a HUD view of the Terminator and the internal viewport of RoboCop when he reboots.

In the computer-animated children's TV series ReBoot, which takes place inside computers, the leader of a system (the equivalent of a city) is called the COMMAND.COM.

See also

  (starts the command processor as the first process)
 SHELL (CONFIG.SYS directive)(to override default command processor)
 COMSPEC (environment variable)(set by COMMAND.COM to reload transient portion of itself)
 CMDLINE (environment variable)(set by COMMAND.COM to pass long command lines to external programs)
  (third-party replacement command processors)
 DOSSHELL / ViewMAX(alternative DOS shells)

 List of DOS commands
 Comparison of command shells
 (have similar command processors not named COMMAND.COM)
 PC-MOS/386(has a similar command processor also named COMMAND.COM)
 Transient Program Area (TPA)(area available for use either by the running application or the transient portion of COMMAND.COM)
 SpartaDOS X(a similar implementation for Atari computers)

References

Further reading

External links
  – Source code to COMMAND.COM version 2.11 released by Microsoft as part of MS-DOS 2.0
  – Source code to COMMAND.COM version 1.17 released by Microsoft as part of MS-DOS 1.25
 FreeCom – COMMAND.COM implementation of FreeDOS
MS-DOSx86 - informative updates of MS-DOSx86 

Command shells
DOS command shells
Windows command shells
Scripting languages
DOS files
Windows files
External DOS commands
MSX-DOS